Bir Dilek Tut Benim İçin is İzel's sixth studio album. It was released in April 2005. This album has significant difference that she starts working with Sinan Akçıl. The songs in this album are mostly written by Sinan Akçıl. Additionally, there are three Sezen Aksu songs and one Özdemir Erdoğan song, called Aç Kapıyı.

Track listing

Personnel 
 Production – Avrupa Müzik
 Producer – Sinan Akçıl
 Mix – İmaj, Miam, Mod Yapım
 Mastering – (master&servant) Hamburg
 Photographs – Gül Gülbahar
 Graphic Design – Özlem Semiz
 Hair – Metin Aydın
 Make-up – Zehra Yılmaz

Music videos

İzel Çeliköz albums
2005 albums